FFRR Records (sometimes credited as Full Frequency Range Recordings) is a dance music label previously run and founded by English DJ Pete Tong. Originally the dance music label of London Records, FFRR is currently a sublabel of Parlophone, a division of Warner Music Group. The label name references the recording technique (full frequency range recording) developed by Sir Edward Lewis's Decca Records.

The original incarnation of FFRR was founded in 1986, and also had two subsidiaries: Double F Double R Records and Ffrreedom Records. The label's ear logo was copied from the original FFRR logo source, as found at the top of the London Records logo. The label name was stylized as ffrr, rather than FFRR.

FFRR's parent company London was run by Roger Ames as his own 'semi-autonomous indie' from within the major label group PolyGram, so when Ames joined Warner Music as Chair and CEO, London/FFRR went with him. In 2011, Pete Tong and Warner revived FFRR, and put the label under the Parlophone umbrella when the latter acquired that label in 2013. In 2017, Warner Music sold London Recordings post-1979 catalogue and with it FFRR's 1986 catalogue to Because Music.

In 2019, the label was taken over by Andy Daniell, formally of Defected Records and got a relaunch in 2021 with a new updated logo created in association with designer Trevor Jackson. The first releases under this new brand identity will be DJ Morgan Geist's Storm Queen project with "For A Fool" and the "Loving Touch EP" from Burns.

Artists
 BURNS
 Eats Everything
 Alan Fitzpatrick 
 Sonny Fodera
 Sam Gellaitry 
 Diplo 
 BLOND:ISH 
 David Guetta
 Obskür
 Storm Queen
 SIDEPIECE
 Jengi
 Skin On Skin

Former artists

 All Seeing I
 Armand Van Helden
 Artful Dodger
 Asian Dub Foundation (Slash/FFRR)
 Basic Tape
 Berri
 Brand New Heavies
 Brother Brown
 The Carburetors
 Carl Cox
 Caterina Valente
 CJ Bolland
 Clubhouse (this act were not signed directly to ffrr, who licensed "Deep in My Heart" from Media Records)
 Cookie Crew
 D Mob
 Danny Campbell
 Dansson
 Diana Brown & Barrie K. Sharpe
 Denney
 DJ Icey
 DJ Krush
 DJ Skribble
 East Side Beat
 Electra
 Farley Jackmaster Funk
 Fine Young Cannibals (this act were signed to London, though their greatest hits collection The Finest was credited to ffrr)

 Frankie Knuckles
 Goldie
 Group Home (PayDay/FFRR)
 Oliver Heldens
 Hive
 Isotonik
 Jamie Principle
 Jay-Z (PayDay/FFRR)
 Jeru the Damaja (PayDay/FFRR)
 Joe Roberts
 June Montana
 Just Kiddin
 Lenny Fontana
 Krystal Klear
 Lil Louis
 Luke Vibert
 The Magician
 Marcel Mule
 Matrix & Futurebound
 Midnight City
 Paul Woolford
 Monteux, Pierre
 Narcotic Thrust
 Nightcrawlers (this act were initially signed to 4th & B'way and then to Arista/BMG's Final Vinyl label, though ffrr picked up the rights to the "Push the Feeling On" remixes, while John Reid was unsigned)
 O.C. (PayDay/FFRR)
 One Dove (signed to Boy's Own Productions, who licensed their album to ffrr)
 Orbital

 Power Pill
 DJ Richie Rich
 Sagat
 Salt n Pepa (Next Plateau/FFRR)
 Salt Tank
 Sander Kleinenberg
 Sasha (DJ)
 Savoy Brown Blues Band
 Shakespears Sister (Siobhan Fahey was signed to London as a member of Bananarama, with her initial 'solo' singles under this name coming under the ffrr name. In 2019, Fahey and Marcella Detroit issued new material via London)
 Shiva
 Showbiz & AG (PayDay/FFRR)
 Simon Harris
 Steve 'Silk' Hurley
 Stretch & Vern (Spot On/FFRR)
 Tinman
 Todd Edwards
 Together
 Tube & Berger
 Urban Thermo Dynamics (PayDay/FFRR)
 Utah Saints
 Vapourspace
 WC & the Madd Circle (PayDay/FFRR)
 The Watts Prophets
 XYconstant
 Yousef
 Z Factor

See also
 List of record labels
 House music

References

British record labels
English record labels
English electronic dance music record labels
House music record labels
London Records
Warner Music labels